Ziarat Tehsil is an administrative subdivision (tehsil) of Ziarat District in the Balochistan province of Pakistan. The tehsil is administratively subdivided into five Union Councils and is headquartered at the city of Ziarat.

References

Tehsils of Balochistan, Pakistan
Ziarat District